The 1999 College Football All-America Team is composed of the following All-American Teams: Associated Press, Football Writers Association of America, American Football Coaches Association, Walter Camp Foundation, The Sporting News, Pro Football Weekly, Football News, and CNNSI.com.

The College Football All-America Team is an honor given annually to the best American college football players at their respective positions. The original usage of the term All-America seems to have been to such a list selected by football pioneer Walter Camp in the 1890s. The NCAA officially recognizes All-Americans selected by the AP, AFCA, FWAA, TSN, and the WCFF to determine Consensus All-Americans.

Offense

Quarterback
Joe Hamilton, Georgia Tech (AFCA, AP, FWAA, Walter Camp, PFW, CNNSI)
Michael Vick, Virginia Tech (TSN, FN)

Running back
Ron Dayne, Wisconsin (AFCA, AP, FWAA, TSN, Walter Camp, PFW, FN)
Thomas Jones, Virginia (AP, FWAA, TSN, Walter Camp, PFW, FN, CNNSI)
Shaun Alexander, Alabama (AFCA, CNNSI)

Wide receiver
Peter Warrick, Florida State (AFCA, AP, FWAA, TSN, Walter Camp, PFW, FN, CNNSI)
Troy Walters, Stanford (AP, FWAA, TSN, Walter Camp, PFW, FN, CNNSI)
Dennis Northcutt, Arizona (AFCA)

Tight end
James Whalen, Kentucky (AP, FWAA, Walter Camp, CNNSI)
Bubba Franks, Miami (FL) (TSN, PFW, FN)
Ibn Green, Louisville (AFCA)

Tackle
Chris McIntosh, Wisconsin (AFCA, AP, FWAA, TSN, Walter Camp, PFW, FN, CNNSI)
Chris Samuels, Alabama (AFCA, AP, FWAA, TSN, Walter Camp, PFW, FN, CNNSI)
Marvel Smith, Arizona State  (FN)

Guard
Cosey Coleman, Tennessee (AFCA, AP, FWAA, Walter Camp, FN)
Jason Whitaker, Florida State (AFCA, AP, Walter Camp, FN)
Brad Bedell, Colorado (FWAA)
Noel LaMontagne, Virginia (TSN)
Richard Mercier, Miami (FL) (TSN, PFW)
Steve Hutchinson, Michigan (PFW, CNNSI)
 Dominic Raiola, Nebraska (CNNSI)

Center
Ben Hamilton, Minnesota (AP, TSN)
Rob Riti, Missouri (AFCA, Walter Camp)
Mike Malano, San Diego State (FWAA)
John St. Clair, Virginia(CNNSI, PFW)

Defense

End
Courtney Brown, Penn State (AFCA, AP, FWAA, TSN, Walter Camp, PFW, FN, CNNSI)
Corey Moore, Virginia Tech (AFCA, AP, FWAA, TSN, Walter Camp, PFW, FN, CNNSI)
Alex Brown, Florida (Walter Camp, FN)

Tackle
Corey Simon, Florida State (AFCA, AP, FWAA, TSN, Walter Camp, PFW, CNNSI)
Casey Hampton, Texas (AP, FWAA, FN)
Chris Hovan, Boston College (AFCA, PFW, CNNSI)
Rob Renes, Michigan (TSN)

Linebacker
LaVar Arrington, Penn State (AFCA, AP, FWAA, TSN, Walter Camp, PFW, FN, CNNSI)
Mark Simoneau, Kansas State (AFCA, AP, FWAA, TSN, Walter Camp, CNNSI)
Rob Morris, BYU  (AP, TSN, FN,)
Brandon Short, Penn State (AP, FWAA, Walter Camp)
Raynoch Thompson, Tennessee (AFCA, AP, PFW, CNNSI)
Barrin Simpson, Mississippi State (TSN)
Keith Bulluck, Syracuse (PFW)
Na'il Diggs, Ohio State (FN)
Julian Peterson, Michigan State (FN)
Keith Adams, Clemson (FN)

Cornerback
Deltha O'Neal, California (AFCA, AP, FWAA, CNNSI)
Ralph Brown, Nebraska (Walter Camp, TSN, FN)
Mike Brown, Nebraska (AP, FWAA)
Jamar Fletcher, Wisconsin (TSN, PFW, FN. CNNSI)
Ike Charlton, Virginia Tech (PFW)
Ben Kelly, Colorado (FN)

Safety
Tyrone Carter, Minnesota (AFCA, AP, FWAA, TSN, Walter Camp, CNNSI)
Deon Grant, Tennessee (AFCA, TSN, Walter Camp, PFW, FN, CNNSI)
Brian Urlacher, New Mexico (AFCA, AP, FWAA, Walter Camp, PFW)

Special teams

Kicker
Sebastian Janikowski, Florida State (AFCA, AP, FWAA, TSN, Walter Camp, PFW, FN, CNNSI)

Punter
Andrew Bayes, East Carolina (AFCA, FWAA, Walter Camp, FN, CNNSI)
Shane Lechler, Texas A&M (AP, PFW)
Brian Schmitz, North Carolina (TSN)

All-purpose player / return specialist
Dennis Northcutt, Arizona (AP, FWAA, CNNSI-AP)
David Allen, Kansas State (AFCA, CNNSI-PR)
Deltha O'Neal, California (TSN, PFW, FN)
Ben Kelly, Colorado(CNNSI-KR)

See also
 1999 All-Big 12 Conference football team
 1999 All-Big Ten Conference football team
 1999 All-SEC football team

References
 AFCA – AFCA
 Associated Press – AP 
 Football Writers – FWAA
 The Sporting News – The Sporting News
 Walter Camp – Walter Camp
 Pro Football Weekly (Archived 2009-05-13) – Pro Football Weekly
 FN (Archived 2009-05-13) – Football News
 All-Americans, all around – Sports Illustrated

All-America Team
College Football All-America Teams